Kohmo is a district in the Itäharju-Varissuo ward of the city of Turku, in Finland. It is located to the northeast of the city, and is a small, reasonably new residential suburb.

The current population of Kohmo is 1,223, and it is increasing at an annual rate of 0.74%. 29.03% of the district's population are under 15 years old, while 5.15% are over 65. The district's linguistic makeup is 80.78% Finnish, 3.35% Swedish, and 15.86% other.

See also
 Districts of Turku
 Districts of Turku by population

Districts of Turku